The 2010 European Fencing Championships was the 23rd edition and was held in Leipzig, Germany. The event took place from July 17–22, 2010.

Schedule

Medal summary

Men's events

Women's events

Medal table

Results overview

Men

Foil individual

Foil team

Epée individual

Epée team

Sabre individual

Sabre team

Women

Sabre individual

Sabre team

Foil individual

Foil team

Epée individual

Épée team

References

External links
Official site

European Fencing Championships
W
Fencing Championships
Sports competitions in Leipzig
International fencing competitions hosted by Germany
2010s in Saxony
July 2010 sports events in Germany